The Coffee Shop was a restaurant and bar located next to Union Square, New York City. Before The Coffee Shop opened, the building was home to a coffee shop and cafe called Chase. The owners of Chase had placed a large neon sign outside the building reading "Coffee Shop" and the new tenant took its name from the sign and left it attached to the building. The restaurant was known for being popular with celebrities and members of New York's fashion scene.

In mid-2018, the restaurant's owners announced it would close in October 2018. It is one of several restaurants on Union Square that have closed due to rising rents.

References

1990 establishments in New York City
Restaurants established in 1990
Defunct restaurants in New York City
Restaurants disestablished in 2018
2018 disestablishments in New York (state)